Ernst Herz was an Austrian figure skater. He was the 1908 European champion and 1909 World bronze medalist.

Results

Sources
World results
European results

Navigation

Austrian male single skaters
European Figure Skating Championships medalists